Candalides viriditincta is a species of butterfly of the family Lycaenidae. It was described by Gerald Edward Tite in 1963. It is found in West Irian (the Weyalnd Mountains and Snow Mountains).

References

Candalidini
Butterflies described in 1963